Medny Island, also spelled Mednyy or Mednyi, sometimes called Copper Island in English (literally translated from Russian), is the smaller (after Bering Island) of the two main islands in the Commander Islands in the North Pacific Ocean, east of Kamchatka, Russia. (The other fifteen are better described as islets and rocks.) These islands belong to the Kamchatka Krai of the Russian Federation.

The island was uninhabited until the late 19th century, when Aleuts came from Attu Island in the Aleutian Islands to Medny Island.

History
The island was sighted by on 5 November 1741 by Bering and his crew while returning from the expedition during which he found America from the west, but he did not land on this island.

The Russian naval officer and historian Vasily Berch believed that Yemelyan Basov reached this island in 1745, during his second of four expeditions to the Commander Islands between 1743 and 1749, and that most of the furs he brought back to Kamchatka in 1745 were hunted on this island.

Towards the end of the 19th century, the settlement of Preobrazhenskoye was established by Aleuts who moved there from Attu Island. 

According to linguists, the island's residents spoke a creole language, known as the Mednyj Aleut language, which combined Russian and Aleut vocabulary and grammar.

In 1970, all citizens of the island were moved to neighboring Bering Island. Until 2001, the island was occupied as a frontier post. Since then, the island has been completely uninhabited. Scientific studies of the fauna and flora are conducted annually.

Ecology
Medny Island is home to many Steller sea lions. 340 pups were born on the island in 1999, and 153 in 2016.

References

External links

Medny Island at Northern Pacific Fund 

Islands of the Commander Islands
Islands of the Bering Sea
Islands of the Russian Far East
Islands of Kamchatka Krai